In differential geometry, a complete Riemannian manifold  is called a Ricci soliton if, and only if, there exists a smooth vector field  such that

for some constant . Here  is the Ricci curvature tensor and  represents the Lie derivative. If there exists a function  such that  we call  a gradient Ricci soliton and the soliton equation becomes 

Note that when  or  the above equations reduce to the Einstein equation. For this reason Ricci solitons are a generalization of Einstein manifolds.

Self-similar solutions to Ricci flow  
A Ricci soliton  yields a self-similar solution to the Ricci flow equation

In particular, letting 

and integrating the time-dependent vector field  to give a family of diffeormorphisms , with  the identity, yields a Ricci flow solution  by taking 

In this expression  refers to the pullback of the metric  by the diffeomorphism .

Examples of Ricci solitons

Shrinking
 Gaussian shrinking soliton 
 Shrinking round sphere 
 Shrinking round cylinder 
 The four dimensional FIK shrinker 
The four dimensional BCCD shrinker 
Compact gradient Kahler-Ricci shrinkers 
 Einstein manifolds of positive scalar curvature

Steady
 The 2d cigar soliton (a.k.a. Witten's black hole) 
 The 3d rotationally symmetric Bryant soliton and its generalization to higher dimensions 
Ricci flat manifolds

Expanding
Einstein manifolds of negative scalar curvature

Singularity models in Ricci flow 
Shrinking and steady Ricci solitons are fundamental objects in the study of Ricci flow as they appear as blow-up limits of singularities. In particular, it is known that all Type I singularities are modeled on non-collapsed gradient shrinking Ricci solitons. Type II singularities are expected to be modeled on steady Ricci solitons in general, however to date this has not been proven, even though all known examples are.

Notes

References

 

Riemannian geometry